Statistics of Moldovan National Division for the 1993–94 season. It was contested by 16 teams and Zimbru Chişinău won the championship.

League standings

Results

References
Moldova - List of final tables (RSSSF)

Moldovan Super Liga seasons
1993–94 in Moldovan football
Moldova